Matteo Davenia (born 7 January 1993 in Milan) is a racing driver from Italy.

Career

Karting
Davenia began his motorsport career in karting back in 2003, finishing fourth in the Italian Junior Championship. He was also champion of the 2007 Italian Rotax 125 championship.

Formula Three
Davenia moved up to single-seaters in 2008, competing in the Italian Formula Three Championship finale at Vallelunga, driving for Europa Corse in the Trofeo Nazionale CSAI class. He finished 23rd overall in the championship, after finishing tenth and thirteenth in the two races.

Formula Renault
Davenia joined the Cram Competition team in 2009, to compete in the Formule Renault 2.0 Suisse championship. He wasn't so successful in this series, winding up fourteenth in the championship. In the Formula 2000 Light Italy and Formula Renault 2.0 Italy, he was a guest driver at Monza.

International Formula Master
In the third round at Brno of the 2009 season, Davenia was a guest driver in the International Formula Master series, with Cram Competition. He finished fourteenth in the first race and twelfth in the second race.

Racing record

Career summary

References

External links
 Official site 
 
 

1993 births
Living people
Racing drivers from Milan
Formula Renault 2.0 Alps drivers
Italian Formula Renault 2.0 drivers
Italian Formula Three Championship drivers
International Formula Master drivers
Formula Abarth drivers
Euroformula Open Championship drivers
RP Motorsport drivers
Cram Competition drivers
Durango drivers